Brenda Raganot (born September 8, 1966) is a Filipino American professional female bodybuilder.

Bodybuilding career

Amateur
In 1984, Raganot began training as a bodybuilder in high school. She was influenced when she saw a film called Pumping Iron 2, which featured bodybuilder Rachel McLish. In 1991, she began training from bodybuilder Debbie Houck. She regards Debbie what brought her from the amateur level to the pro ranks. Brenda earned her pro card in 1998 when she won the middleweight and overall titles at the NPC Nationals.

Professional
Raganot alternated between the lightweight and heavyweight classes since weight classes were introduced at the pro level in 2000.  She has been one of the top pros in recent years, with her best results being lightweight class wins at the Ms. International in 2000 and 2005.

Contest history 
1993 NPC USA Championship - 3rd (MW)
1994 North American - 1st (HW)
1995 NPC Nationals - 2nd (MW)
1996 NPC USA Championship - 4th (HW)
1997 NPC Nationals - 2nd (MW)
1998 NPC Nationals - 1st (MW and Overall)
1999 Pro Extravanganza - 2nd
1999 IFBB Ms. Olympia - 9th
2000 Ms. International - 1st (LW)
2000 IFBB Ms. Olympia - 2nd (LW)
2001 Ms. International - 2nd (LW)
2001 IFBB Ms. Olympia - 4th (LW)
2003 Ms. International - 3rd (HW)
2004 Ms. International - 5th (HW)
2005 Ms. International - 1st (LW)
2005 IFBB Ms. Olympia - 5th
2006 IFBB Ms. Olympia - 15th
2007 Sacramento Pro - 3rd (HW)
2007 Atlantic City Pro - 12th (HW)
2008 Ms. International - 5th
2008 IFBB Ms. Olympia - 12th
2009 IFBB Ms. International 11th
2009 IFBB New York Women's Pro - 8th
2009 IFBB Atlantic City Pro - 4th
2010 IFBB Ms. International - 10th

Personal life
She currently lives in Seattle, Washington. She is married. She is a Christian. She currently works as a US postal clerk.

External links 
AMG-Lite: Brenda Raganot

References 

| colspan = 3 align = center | Ms. International 
|- 
| width = 30% align = center | Preceded by:-
| width = 40% align = center | First (2000)
| width = 30% align = center | Succeeded by:Dayana Cadeau
|- 
| width = 30% align = center | Preceded by:Dayana Cadeau
| width = 40% align = center | Second (2005)
| width = 30% align = center | Succeeded by:-

1966 births
Filipino American female bodybuilders
American sportspeople of Filipino descent
Living people
Sportspeople from Annapolis, Maryland
Professional bodybuilders
Sportspeople from Seattle
21st-century American women